The Marsh Rainbow Arch Bridge is a historic bridge over Duncan Creek located in Chippewa Falls, Wisconsin. It was added to the National Register of Historic Places in 1982.

History
Built in 1916, the bridge was designed by James Barney Marsh of North Lake, Wisconsin, and constructed by the Iowa Bridge Company at a cost of $13,950. It replaced another concrete bridge built in 1915, which was immediately wrecked by the spring flood of 1916. The use of reinforced concrete in bridges had been pioneered in Germany and Hungary and was controversial in Chippewa then. It was the only bridge over Duncan Creek to survive the flood of 1934, and after 100 years, it is still in good condition.

See also
List of bridges documented by the Historic American Engineering Record in Wisconsin

References

External links

Road bridges on the National Register of Historic Places in Wisconsin
Buildings and structures in Chippewa County, Wisconsin
Bridges completed in 1916
Historic American Engineering Record in Wisconsin
National Register of Historic Places in Chippewa County, Wisconsin
Concrete bridges in the United States
Tied arch bridges in the United States
Through arch bridges in the United States